Black Mirror is a British science fiction television anthology series.

Black Mirror or Black mirror may also refer to:

Arts and entertainment
 Black Mirror (novel), a 2002 novel by Gail Jones
 "Black Mirror" (song), a 2007 song by Arcade Fire
 Batman: The Black Mirror, a 10-issue comic book series by Scott Snyder
 The Black Mirror (video game), a 2003 video game
 Black Mirror (2017 video game), a 2017 reboot

Other uses
 Black mirror (glass) or Claude glass, an 18th-century artist's tool

See also
 Dark Mirror (disambiguation)